Mark Perkins may refer to:

Mark Perkins (footballer) (born 1964), Australian rules footballer
Mark L. Perkins (born 1949), former president of Towson University
Vince Perkins (Mark Vincent Perkins, born 1981), baseball player
Merk (musician) (Mark Perkins, born 1994), New Zealand musician

See also
Perkins (disambiguation)